Grand Ayatollah Sayyid Mohammad Mofti al-Shi'a Mousavi (Persian:  السيد محمد مفتي الشيعة موسوي) (born 1928- died 19 May 2010) was an Iranian Twelver Shi'a Marja.

He has studied in seminaries of Qum, Iran under Grand Ayatollah Seyyed Hossein Borujerdi and Ruhollah Khomeini. He has also studied in seminaries of Najaf, Iraq under Grand Ayatollah Muhsin al-Hakim, Abu al-Qasim al-Khoei and Ayatollah Shaykh Husayn Hilli.

See also
List of Maraji
List of deceased Maraji

Notes

External links
Biography (In Persian)

Iranian grand ayatollahs
Iranian Islamists
Shia Islamists
1928 births
2010 deaths